is located in Toyoake, Aichi, Japan. It is used for horse racing. It was built in 1994. It has a capacity of 58,400. It has 8,795 seats.

Physical attributes
Chukyo Racecourse has a grass courses, a dirt course, and a jump course.

The turf's measures 1600m (7/8 mile + 629 feet). Races can be run on the "A Course" rail setting (on the hedge), the "B Course" setting (rail out 3 meters), or the "C Course" setting (rail out 7 meters).

1000m, 1200m, 1700m, 1800m, 2000m, 2500m and 2800m races run on the oval.

The dirt course measures 1418 meters (7/8 mile + 278 feet).
1000m, 1600m, 1700m, 2300m races run on the oval.

Notable races

Access
The closest train station is Chūkyō-keibajō-mae Station, which is named after this racecourse.

References

Sports venues in Aichi Prefecture
Horse racing venues in Japan
Toyoake, Aichi
Sports venues completed in 1994
1994 establishments in Japan